Garland is a city in northeastern Box Elder County, Utah, United States. The population was 2,400 at the 2010 census.

History

Garland was originally named "Sunset" and settled in 1890. The first settler was David E. Manning.

It was a company town and was renamed after William Garland, the contractor who built the Utah Sugar Company factory at the location, completed in 1903. The company donated land to the LDS Church for a "ward chapel and amusement hall" and also built 14 homes, a hotel, and other buildings. The town had a general store, a bank, a post office, and a newspaper named The Garland Globe in 1906. By the 1920s there were other merchants, a flour mill, a Carnegie library, and a high school.

Geography
Garland is located in eastern Box Elder County in the Bear River Valley. It is bordered by the city of Tremonton to the south.

Demographics

As of the census of 2000, there were 1,943 people, 588 households, and 476 families residing in the city. The population density was 1,097.8 people per square mile (423.8/km2). There were 621 housing units at an average density of 350.9 per square mile (135.5/km2). The racial makeup of the city was 88.99% White, 0.41% Native American, 3.14% Asian, 0.05% Pacific Islander, 5.46% from other races, and 1.96% from two or more races. Hispanic or Latino of any race were 7.87% of the population.

There were 588 households, out of which 51.5% had children under the age of 18 living with them, 69.2% were married couples living together, 7.8% had a female householder with no husband present, and 18.9% were non-families. 17.5% of all households were made up of individuals, and 8.5% had someone living alone who was 65 years of age or older. The average household size was 3.30, and the average family size was 3.74.

In the city, the population was spread out, with 39.6% under 18, 10.4% from 18 to 24, 27.3% from 25 to 44, 14.0% from 45 to 64, and 8.6% who were 65 years of age or older. The median age was 25 years. For every 100 females, there were 96.5 males. For every 100 females aged 18 and over, there were 95.2 males.

The median income for a household in the city was $38,679, and the median income for a family was $42,426. Males had a median income of $35,518 versus $22,237 for females. The per capita income was $13,408. About 5.7% of families and 6.9% of the population were below the poverty line, including 7.6% of those under age 18 and 4.9% of those age 65 or over.

Notable people
Ellwyn R. Stoddard (b.1927), Professor Emeritus of Sociology and Anthropology at the University of Texas at El Paso.

See also

 List of cities and towns in Utah

References

External links

 

Cities in Box Elder County, Utah
Cities in Utah
Populated places established in 1890
Company towns in Utah